Jozef Van Riel (16 November 1943 – 19 January 2023) was a Belgian footballer who played as a defender.

Biography
He later played in Kalmthout and afterwards at Sportkring Sint-Niklaas in Sint-Niklaas and at K.F.C. Diest in Diest. In 1973 he signed a contract with Royal Antwerp. He played 99 matches for the team in the Belgian Pro League, the Belgian Cup and in UEFA Europa League matches. Playing as a defender he had shirt number one and scored eight league goals. In his first two seasons, 1973–74 Belgian First Division and 1974–75 Belgian First Division, he became vice champion of Belgium. In its third and last year he finished eleventh with the team at the 1975–76 Belgian First Division. In 1975 he was on the team during the 1974–75 Belgian Cup where they lost 1–0 to R.S.C. Anderlecht.

Van Riel died on 19 January 2023, at the age of 79.

References

Other websites

1943 births
2023 deaths
People from Ekeren
Belgian footballers
Association football defenders
Belgian Pro League players
Sportkring Sint-Niklaas players
K.F.C. Diest players
Royal Antwerp F.C. players
Place of death missing